Trek  may refer to:

Art and entertainment 
 Trek (band), Russian rock band
 Trek (TV channel), a French TV channel
 Star Trek, a science fiction franchise

Companies 
 Trek Airways, an airline
 Trek Bicycle Corporation, a bicycle manufacturer

Other uses 
 Great Trek, a 19th-century migration of Africa's Boers
 the Trek experiment, UC Berkeley, on board STS-74
 KCNK2, otherwise known as the TREK-1 potassium channel

See also
 Jan Jansz. Treck (1606–1652), still-life painter
 Treck Inc., a software company
 Trekking (disambiguation)
 Sea Trek (disambiguation)
 Trekboer
 Trekker (disambiguation)